FAPP may refer to:

 Filtered Air Positive Pressure
 For All Practical Purposes
 FreeBSD, Apache, PostgreSQL, PHP - See BAPP
 Polokwane International Airport